Indiana Jones and the Staff of Kings is an action-adventure video game published by LucasArts for Nintendo DS, PlayStation 2, PlayStation Portable and Wii. It focuses on Indiana Jones as he searches for his former mentor Charles Kingston, while working to prevent the Nazis from acquiring the "Staff of Kings", said to be the same staff used by Moses to part the Red Sea. The Wii version includes a copy of a previous LucasArts game, Indiana Jones and the Fate of Atlantis, as an unlockable.

The game was initially developed for the higher-end PlayStation 3 and Xbox 360 systems, before switching to the aforementioned lower-end platforms. The game received mixed reviews from critics.

Gameplay 

The plot centers around Indy's search for the Staff of Moses, a journey which takes him to several locations including the Sudan, Panama, San Francisco, and Nepal. The game incorporates a linear structure which includes puzzles to solve, obstacles to clear, and enemies that must either be defeated through hand-to-hand combat, shot down with Indy's sidearm, or defeated using the environment around them. Motion controls in the Nintendo versions (via the Wii Remote and Nunchuk, or the DS stylus, depending on the platform) allow the player to throw punches, use the bullwhip, and perform a wide variety of actions.

The Wii version of the game includes an exclusive co-op story mode (with Indy and Henry Jones Sr.) and unlockable version of the classic point and click adventure Indiana Jones and the Fate of Atlantis (also set in 1939). On the console versions, Big Head mode, Henry Jones Sr., Tuxedo Indy, and Han Solo from Star Wars are unlockable.

Plot 
The story begins with Indiana Jones hunting for an ancient ram's head idol in the Sudan in 1939, which a Nazi expedition is also searching for. Indy traverses a canyon and enters the temple of the idol. After a few narrow escapes, including fighting off a swarm of spiders and nearly getting crushed by collapsing statues, Indy finds the idol and is about to escape when the Nazis discover him. Indy is confronted by their leader, Magnus Voller, an archeologist and old rival of Indy's. Indy is forced to give up the idol, but is able to distract Voller and fight his way through the Nazi camp. He gets in a truck and chases after a plane that is taking off down the runway; he manages to jump onto the wing and throw the pilot out. After getting in a dogfight with other Nazi planes, Indy flies off and returns to the United States.
 
Back in America, Indiana receives a letter from an old friend, antiques collector Archie Tan. He explains that he has information about the disappearance of Indy's former college professor, Charles Kingston. Indy heads to San Francisco to talk to Archie, only to find that he and his granddaughter Suzie have been kidnapped by the local triad. Indy rescues Suzie, and she takes him to her grandfather's office. He also learns of an ancient artifact that Archie was guarding, the Jade Sphere. Indy finds a secret passageway, and then rides a rickety chair lift down into a subterranean chamber filled with old ships. The chairlift gets hit by a thug with a pistol, but Indy manages to survive the ride down. He meets more thugs down below, but dispatches them before finding the Jade Sphere hidden in a pile of cannonballs. A day later, Indy finds Archie being held captive by Magnus Voller and a Nazi agent. Voller orders Indy to hand over the Sphere if he wants to save his friend. Indy appears to throw the Sphere to Voller before he and Archie flee, but it turns out to be nothing but a cheap statue. Indy and Archie are chased by gunmen in cars; Indy uses his pistol to shoot out the tires or engines of the cars (in the Nintendo DS version, this is replaced by a brawl on top of a cable car), and Archie helps him escape in a street trolley. After Archie tells Indy about the events that transpired, he decides to head for Panama, where Kingston found the Sphere years ago.

Upon reaching his destination, Indy gets into a minor argument with an Irish photographer named Maggie O'Mally, who forces him to let her accompany him. However, their campsite and the surrounding forest are attacked by native mercenaries in Magnus' employment. Indy manages to fend off the attackers (he also saves a village of Indians in the Wii and PS2 version), and obtains the key to an ancient pyramid. Indy travels through the ruined pyramid, which is based on the Mayan underworld, which leads to a hidden diary of Kingston's revealing details of the Staff of Kings, the artifact that Moses used to part the Red Sea. After obtaining further clues on the staff's location in Istanbul, Indy locates the elderly Kingston in a Nepalese village. Unfortunately, the Nazis have followed Indiana to the Staff's resting place and kidnap Kingston and Maggie (who is actually an undercover MI6 agent). Indy then sneaks onto the Nazis' zeppelin, the Odin, and rescues Maggie, but is unable to prevent Magnus from fatally shooting Kingston and using the Staff to clear a path through the Red Sea. In response, Indy and Maggie chase Magnus on a motorcycle with a sidecar and defeat him with a rocket launcher. Magnus then attempts to escape, but Indy sucker-punches him into the wall of water. Upon reaching dry land, the staff unleashes a blast that causes the water to sink the Odin. It then turns into a snake, and Indy throws it away, lamenting "Ugh.. It can take care of itself...".

Development 
In May 2005, LucasArts announced an Indiana Jones game that would be released for PlayStation 3 (PS3) and Xbox 360 in 2007. The game was expected to be technologically advanced, and would have utilized a run-time animation technology known as Euphoria. LucasArts also partnered with Pixelux Entertainment to use its Digital Molecular Matter technology in the game, increasing the realism of its environments. Industrial Light & Magic worked on the game's lighting. The game was tentatively known as Indiana Jones 2007, and the first trailer was released in May 2006. The game was 20-percent finished at the time. The game was in development by LucasArts, but the project was sidelined by another one of the company's games, Star Wars: The Force Unleashed. Aside from the PS3 and Xbox 360, the Indiana Jones game was also being developed externally for PlayStation 2 (PS2), PlayStation Portable (PSP), and Nintendo DS.

The game missed its 2007 release, eventually leading to rumors of its cancellation. However, in January 2009, LucasArts released a trailer for Indiana Jones and the Staff of Kings, to be released for PS2, PSP, Nintendo DS, and the Wii. It uses the same storyline as the PS3/Xbox 360 version, and is particularly inspired by the 1981 Indiana Jones film Raiders of the Lost Ark. The story was devised by LucasArts. Indiana Jones filmmakers George Lucas and Steven Spielberg provided their input on the game's story. The game was developed by Artificial Mind and Movement, and was designed to take advantage of each platform's capabilities, such as the Wii's motion controls and the DS' touchscreen. Each version includes a few unique levels. For the Wii version, Artificial Mind and Movement suggested the inclusion of Indiana Jones and the Fate of Atlantis early on in development. LucasArts canceled the PS3 and Xbox 360 versions because of timing and financial reasons, choosing in 2008 to focus instead on the other versions. The game includes Indiana Jones music previously composed by John Williams, as well as music from The Young Indiana Jones Chronicles. It also features original music by Gordy Haab and Ray Harman. Indiana Jones is voiced in the game by John Armstrong.

Reception

Indiana Jones and the Staff of Kings received "mixed or average reviews" according to Metacritic.

Several critics reviewed the Wii version. IGN praised its interface, graphic effects, number of extras, interactive levels, and varied gameplay, but criticized its "stupidly implemented motion controls". The A.V. Club gave it an F. They called the motion controls "inexcusable" and stated the game's best aspect was the inclusion of the point-and-click adventure Indiana Jones and the Fate of Atlantis. GameSpot criticized its "terribly laid-out checkpoints", "out-of-date" visuals, and "atrocious, annoying motion controls".

References

External links 
 
 
 

2009 video games
Behaviour Interactive games
Cancelled PlayStation 3 games
Cancelled Xbox 360 games
Staff of Kings
Multiplayer and single-player video games
Nintendo DS games
PlayStation 2 games
PlayStation Portable games
Video games developed in Canada
Video games developed in the United States
Video games set in 1939
Video games set in the 1920s
Video games set in the 1930s
Video games set in Nepal
Video games set in Panama
Video games set in Paris
Video games set in San Francisco
Video games set in South America
Video games set in Sudan
Video games set in Turkey
Wii games
Amaze Entertainment games